Mėšliai is a village in Ignalina District Municipality, Utena County, Lithuania. It is connected to Ceikiniai village. Mėšliai is quite small and there is an ancient farm located there.

References

External links 
Mėšliai map from Maps.lt

Ignalina District Municipality
Villages in Utena County